The Minister of Foreign Affairs  is the Government of Vietnam member in charge of the Ministry of Foreign Affairs. Moreover, member of Council for National Defense and Security. Since 2007, the Minister of Foreign Affairs served as Deputy Prime Minister and member of the Politburo. However, Hoàng Minh Giám, Ung Văn Khiêm, Xuân Thủy, Nguyễn Dy Niên are not the member of Politburo. The current Vietnamese Minister of Foreign Affairs is Bùi Thanh Sơn.

List of ministers
This is a list of Ministers of Foreign Affairs of the Socialist Republic of Vietnam and its historical antecedents:

Democratic Republic of Vietnam

Provisional Revolutionary Government of the Republic of South Vietnam

Socialist Republic of Vietnam

See also
 Minister of Foreign Affairs (South Vietnam)

References

External links
 Official website 

Foreign Ministers
Vietnam
Foreign affairs